The 1988 NCAA Division II women's basketball tournament was the seventh annual tournament hosted by the NCAA to determine the national champion of Division II women's  collegiate basketball in the United States.

Hampton defeated West Texas State in the championship game, 65–48, claiming the Lady Pirates' first NCAA Division II national title. 

The championship rounds were contested in Fargo, North Dakota.

The championship field increased for the first time, from twenty-four to thirty-two teams, in 1988.

Regionals

New England - Waltham, Massachusetts
Location: Dana Center Host: Bentley College

South - Cleveland, Mississippi
Location: Walter Sillers Coliseum Host: Delta State University

West - Pomona, California
Location: Kellogg Gym Host: California State Polytechnic University, Pomona

South Central - Warrensburg, Missouri
Location: CMSU Fieldhouse Host: Central Missouri State University

East - Johnstown, Pennsylvania
Location: Sports Center Host: University of Pittsburgh at Johnstown

South Atlantic - Emmitsburg, Maryland
Location: Knott Athletics and Recreation Center Host: Mount Saint Mary's College and Seminary

North Central - Fargo, North Dakota
Location: Bison Sports Arena Host: North Dakota State University

Great Lakes - Highland Heights, Kentucky
Location: Regents Hall Host: Northern Kentucky University

National Finals - Fargo, North Dakota
Final Four Location: Bison Sports Arena Host: North Dakota State University

All-tournament team
 Jackie Dolberry, Hampton
 Venice Frazer, Hampton
 Karen Drewry, Hampton
 Teresa Tinner, West Texas State
 Kristi Kremer, North Dakota State

See also
 1988 NCAA Division II men's basketball tournament
 1988 NCAA Division I women's basketball tournament
 1988 NCAA Division III women's basketball tournament
 1988 NAIA women's basketball tournament

References
 1988 NCAA Division II women's basketball tournament jonfmorse.com

 
NCAA Division II women's basketball tournament
1988 in sports in North Dakota